Paula Girven (January 12, 1958 – October 17, 2020) was an American athlete. She competed in the women's high jump at the 1976 Summer Olympics.

References

External links
 

1958 births
2020 deaths
Athletes (track and field) at the 1976 Summer Olympics
American female high jumpers
Maryland Terrapins women's track and field athletes
Olympic track and field athletes of the United States
Sportspeople from Virginia